The Shire of Yeerongpilly was a local government area in the southern suburbs of Brisbane, Queensland.

History

On 11 November 1879, the Yeerongpilly Division was created as one of 74 divisions within Queensland under the Divisional Boards Act 1879 with a population of 3428. It included and took its name from Yeerongpilly (now a suburb of Brisbane).

On 16 October 1886, parts of Yeerongpilly Division (from South Brisbane to Rocklea and including Yeerongpilly itself) were excised to create Stephens Division (later Shire of Stephens).

On 24 January 1891, further parts of Yeerongpilly Division (west of Blunder Creek to Wacol) were excised to create Sherwood Division (later Shire of Sherwood).

With the passage of the Local Authorities Act 1902, Yeerongpilly Division became the Shire of Yeerongpilly on 31 March 1903.

On 1 October 1925, the Shire of Yeerongpilly was abolished, with its urban area becoming part of the new City of Brisbane, and the rural areas being divided between the Shires of Beaudesert, Tingalpa and Waterford.

Population

Localities
 Rocklea
 Acacia Ridge
 Archerfield
 Berrinba
 Calamvale
 Kingston
 Tarragindi (split with Shire of Stephens)
 Woodridge
 Yeerongpilly (split with Shire of Stephens)

Chairmen
The chairmen of the Yeerongpilly Shire were:

 1888: John Moffat
 1889: W.H. Coxen
 1890: G. Boyland
 1891: George Grimes
 1892: Nicholas J. Kessels
 1893: John Moffatt
 1894: G. Boyland
 1895: A. Laver
 1896: G. Boyland
 1897: A. Williams
 1898: James Tuckett
 1899: M. Moody
1900: M. Daly
1901: J. Whitfield
1902: A.K. Robertson
1903-1904: J. Whitfield
1905-1906: Thomas Freeney
1907-1908: J. Whitfield
1909-1910: J. McCotter
1911-1913: B.R. Bale
1914: Edwin J. Westaway
1915-1917: James Tuckett
1918-1919: J. Greer
1920-1923: J. McCotter
1924-1925: J. Cox

References

External links
 

Former local government areas of Queensland
1879 establishments in Australia
1925 disestablishments in Australia